Ikatan Naturopatis Indonesia (Indonesian Naturopath Association, or I.N.I.) is the national organisation for traditional Chinese medicine practitioners (known as sin she) in Indonesia. Address: Jln Hayam Wuruk no: 114.

Like modern medical organisations, the I.N.I. maintains a code of ethics for its members, and represents the interests of the traditional Chinese medical profession when dealing with the Indonesian government. It also promotes knowledge about Chinese medicine, not only within the Indonesian Chinese community, but also amongst the Indonesian population in general.

The I.N.I. is notable for launching a legal action in the Indonesian High Court (Makhamah agung), and for lobbying the Indonesian Attorney General (Jaksa agung), securing an exemption from a law banning the use of Chinese language in Indonesia, allowing traditional Chinese herbalists to write prescriptions in the Chinese language, with a promise that the I.N.I. does not intend to rebel or overthrow the Indonesian government.

See also
 Chinese Indonesian

Chinese Indonesian culture
Medical and health organizations based in Indonesia
Overseas Chinese organisations